Tony Campion is Lead Consultant at ArcMedia (www.arcmediaworldwide.co.uk), a communications coaching consultancy in the healthcare sector.

He is a former presenter and reporter for CNN, based in London.

He presented on the BBC's rolling news channel BBC News 24 and also on BBC World News between 2005 and 2009, and has also worked for Reuters, Bloomberg and Sky News.

Campion holds a PhD in particle physics

References

BBC World News
BBC newsreaders and journalists
Living people
Year of birth missing (living people)